Harold "Harry" Holt (1889–1956) was a Welsh footballer who played for Stoke.

Career
Holt was born in Aberystwyth and played amateur football with Aberystwyth Town before joining Stoke in 1910. He played in one first team match which came in a 2–1 win over West Bromwich Albion Reserves during the 1910–11 season before returning to amateur football with Wrexham and then Mold Alexandra.

Career statistics

References

1889 births
1956 deaths
Footballers from Aberystwyth
Welsh footballers
Association football defenders
Aberystwyth Town F.C. players
Stoke City F.C. players
Wrexham A.F.C. players
Mold Alexandra F.C. players